The 2017 IIHF Ice Hockey Women's World Championships were the 19th such series of tournaments organised by the International Ice Hockey Federation. Teams participated at several levels of competition. The competition also served as qualifications for the 2018 competition. At the 2017 annual congress it was decided that the top level would expand from eight to ten teams. As a result, all relegations from the 2017 tournaments were cancelled, and there would also be no relegation in all 2018 tournaments.

Championship (Top Division)

The Top Division tournament was played in Plymouth Township, Michigan, United States, from 31 March to 7 April 2017.

Division I

Division I Group A
The Division I Group A tournament was played in Graz, Austria, from 15 to 21 April 2017.

Division I Group B
The Division I Group B tournament was played in Katowice, Poland, from 8 to 14 April 2017.

Division II

Division II Group A
The Division II Group A tournament was played in Gangneung, South Korea, from 2 to 8 April 2017.

Division II Group B
The Division II Group B tournament was played in Akureyri, Iceland, from 27 February to 5 March 2017.

Division II Group B Qualification
The Division II Group B Qualification tournament was played in Taipei, Taiwan, from 12 to 17 December 2016.

References

External links
Official website of IIHF

 
World Ice Hockey Championships - Women's
IIHF Women's World Ice Hockey Championships